The 1988 Penn State Nittany Lions football team represented the Pennsylvania State University in the 1988 NCAA Division I-A football season. The team was coached by Joe Paterno and played its home games in Beaver Stadium in University Park, Pennsylvania.

Schedule

Roster

NFL Draft
Six Nittany Lions were drafted in the 1989 NFL Draft.

References

Penn State
Penn State Nittany Lions football seasons
Penn State Nittany Lions football